Milan Halaška (born 8 January 1988) is a Czech football player who currently plays for FK Bohumín.

He is married to his wife, Petra Neubertová.

References

1988 births
Living people
Czech footballers
Czech First League players
SFC Opava players
FC Zbrojovka Brno players
NK Inter Zaprešić players
Association football midfielders
SK Líšeň players
MFK Karviná players
FK Frýdek-Místek players
People from Krnov
Czech Republic youth international footballers
Sportspeople from the Moravian-Silesian Region